Grody is a surname. Notable people with the surname include:

Bill Grody 
Kathryn Grody (born 1946), American actress and writer